U.S. Route 331 (US 331) is a spur of U.S. Route 31. Unlike US 131, US 231, and US 431, US 331 never intersects with its "parent" route, US 31; the two routes come within  of each other in Montgomery.

Route description

Florida

U.S. Route 331 begins at U.S. Route 98 in Santa Rosa Beach. From there it runs north towards a long concrete slab bridge over Choctawhatchee Bay. 

The bridge ends at Wheeler Point, and the road makes a sharp curve to the northeast where it encounters an intersection with County Road 3280 (CR 3280), and then turns straight north again. Running along the eastern edge of Mallet Bayou, and LaGrange Bayou, the road makes a less drastic northeastern curve at the bridge over Ramsey Branch, and it eventually intersects State Road 20 (SR 20) on the eastern edge of Freeport. 

From that point it runs along the eastern edge of Eglin Air Force Base, which includes the Eglin Wildlife Management Area. This territory ends across the street from the intersection of Edgewood Circle. After the intersection with Indian Creek Ranch Road, US 331/SR 83 makes a slight northwest curve to meet the southern end of County Road 278 (Coy Burgess Loop). The road runs straight north from there and becomes a four-lane divided highway as it approaches the north end of CR 278 just south of the interchange with Interstate 10 (I-10) at exit 85. Immediately afterwards, US 331/SR 83 enters the city of DeFuniak Springs.

Within the city, US 331/SR 83 remains a divided highway running in the same trajectory, where the only intersection of any level of importance is CR 280(Bob Sikes Road). After the intersection with Myrtle Avenue, it takes another slight curve to the northeast. Two more local intersections will be encountered before the road runs beneath a bridge for the CSX P&A Subdivision, and a parallel bridge with Baldwin Avenue just before the intersection with U.S. Route 90, where both U.S. Route 331 and SR 83 split into two separate concurrencies; US 331 turns left while SR 83 turns right. US 90/331 curves northwest where it encounters the western terminus of Baldwin Avenue, the very city street it crosses under on the north side of the P&A Subdivision. After this it runs along the same railroad line where it encounters the DeFuniak Springs Country Club, but at the eastern edge of DeFuniak Springs Airport, the concurrency ends as US 90 heads west towards Pensacola, while US 331 turns north onto the two-lane hidden SR 187.

The newly independent US 331 runs straight north for one mile. Shortly after the intersection of Walton Road, US 331 curves slightly to the northwest. This trajectory continues for 1.7 miles until it curves more to the northwest just before the intersection with the western terminus of Sunrise Road which leads to CR 1883. From that point it runs north of Holly Lake and then King Lake, and soon after this serves as the northern terminus of a local street named King Lane Road which leads to a local campground. Continuing in the same direction, the road passes more local dead end streets before crossing a bridge over Gum Creek. then climbs a small hill as it passes by an abandoned farm field and later a dirt road named Andrews Road before approaching the western terminus of CR 192, which also shares an intersection with Doctor Nelson Road. 

Entering Liberty the road descends slightly into a minimal valley and begins to curve more westerly after passing by the First Baptist Church, then crosses a bridge over Middle Creek. After the bridge it passes a local dirt road named Harrison Drive. Most of the road is surrounded by forestland, but the woods on the southwest side are thinner because the obstruct some local farmland, interrupted by the clearing for another church on the southwest side of the road. Next door is a local gas station and convenience store, which is across the street from one of three private houses on the northeast corner of the west end of County Road 1084. One more church can be found on the southwest side of the road before it crosses over another bridge over Big Swamp Creek, and another bridge over the Bee Branch between South Hall Road and Williams Road before it starts to curve back to the northwest. The road maintains the same relative trajectory as it passes some farmland and local dead end streets, After passing under a power line right-of-way, US 331 encounters the first intersection and south end of a concurrency with County Road 2, a former segment of State Road 2. Just north of that intersection on the opposite side is the eastern terminus of County Road 2A. Later the road curves around another pond into another angle further to the northwest. The telephone poles along the east side of the street veer off into the woods along a former segment of the road just south of the end of the concurrency with CR 2, after which the road turns straight north. However the straight trajectory doesn't last as long as one might expect as the road curves slightly to the right south of the shared intersection with South Suttles Road and the abandoned Pittman Road and then runs between two ponds before curving back to the left in order to cross a bridge over Long Creek. North of the bridge, it enters Gordon, where it encounters two county roads along the east side, specifically the western terminus of County Road 0605 (Jackson Still Cutoff) and then the southern terminus of County Road 285 which leads to Britton Hill, the highest natural point in the State of Florida.

The road enters the Town of Paxton along some farm fields on both sides of the road, and the first intersection is a private driveway leading northeast to a house on the other side of Quiet Lake. The next intersection is a dirt road to the southwest named Wain Huckabee Road. Only when it approaches a water tower on the grounds of the Ellis Agricultural Field Airport does US 331 get close to a moderately important intersection, specifically the intersection of County Road 147 (Webster Lane), which despite being an odd-numbered route spans west to east from SR 85 west of Paxton to CR 285 north of Britton Hill. Despite being in an incorporated community, the surroundings of US 331 remain relatively agricultural with exceptions of farm-related businesses, and some random schools, churches, residences, local stores, and even the Town Hall, the vicinity of which actually contains a center left-turn lane. US 331 actually begins to curve straight north again between the intersections of South end of Vann Circle and Clear Springs Road and the north end of Vann Circle where it will remain throughout the rest of the state. The last two intersections in Florida are with another loop street, albeit a deformed one named Geohagan Circle. US 331 crosses the Florida-Alabama State line entering Florala, where SR 187 terminates, Alabama State Route 9 begins, and the road itself momentarily becomes a four-lane undivided highway.

Alabama
Once crossing the state line, US 331 immediately enters Florala, where it starts a concurrency with Alabama State Route 54 (SR 54) on the east side of town. The highway continues into downtown Florala, where SR 55 joins the concurrency (this intersection serves as a terminus for SR 54).

US 331 continues northward to Opp, where it becomes concurrent with US 84 as a bypass around the eastern side of town. A business route of US 331 continues northward through town and rejoins US 331 north of Opp, just after US 84 leaves the concurrency with US 331. The highway then continues northward and enters Crenshaw County. It keeps north and into the town of Brantley, where US 29 forms a concurrency with US 331.

The highways continue north into Luverne, where US 29 turns northeast and US 331 turns northwest as they leave town. US 331 soon turns back to the north and passes through several small communities before entering Montgomery County. It passes through several more small communities before entering the southern part of the city of Montgomery. It then intersects the southern bypass of the city (US 80 and US 82). This intersection serves as the northern terminus for US 331.

History

The original version of US 331 traveled along what is now U.S. Route 29 south of Flomaton, Alabama between 1926 and 1936. The current version was revived in 1953.

Beginning in 1956, signs for U.S. Highways in Florida had different colors for each highway. The shield for US 331 was green with white lettering and outline, until the state was forced by the federal government to conform to standards that required consistent black-and-white signs in 1993.

Until 2007, US 331/SR 83 turned left at State Road 20 in Florida in a short concurrency until it reached Madison Street, then traveled north past Owl's Head Road just south of Eglin Air Force Base.

Major intersections

References

External links

Endpoints of U.S. Highway 331

 
United States Numbered Highway System
31-3
Bypasses in Alabama
31-3
Transportation in Walton County, Florida
Transportation in Covington County, Alabama
Transportation in Crenshaw County, Alabama
Transportation in Montgomery County, Alabama
Transportation in Montgomery, Alabama